Living It Up! is a Philippine television lifestyle show broadcast by Q. Hosted by Raymond Gutierrez, Tim Yap and Issa Litton, it premiered in March 2007. The show concluded in 2009.

Accolades
Winner, Best Lifestyle Show & Hosts (Raymond Gutierrez, Tim Yap & Issa Litton) - 2008 PMPC Star Awards for TV.
Winner, Best Lifestyle Show Hosts (Raymond Gutierrez, Tim Yap & Issa Litton) - 2007 PMPC Star Awards for TV.
Nominated, Best Lifestyle Show- 2007 PMPC Star Awards for TV.

2007 Philippine television series debuts
2009 Philippine television series endings
Philippine television shows
Q (TV network) original programming